Fourmarierite is a secondary uranium-lead mineral. It was named for the Belgian geologist Paul Fourmarier (1877–1970).

References

Lead minerals
Uranium(VI) minerals
Orthorhombic minerals
Minerals in space group 36